Proteuchloris is a genus of moths in the family Geometridae.

References

Natural History Museum Lepidoptera genus database

Comibaenini
Geometridae genera